Madeleine Marie Stowe Mora (born August 18, 1958) is an American actress. She appeared mostly on television before her role in the 1987 crime-comedy film Stakeout. She went on to star in the films Revenge (1990), Unlawful Entry (1992), The Last of the Mohicans (1992), Blink (1993), 12 Monkeys (1995), The General's Daughter (1999), and We Were Soldiers (2002). For her role in the 1993 independent film Short Cuts, she won the National Society of Film Critics Award for Best Supporting Actress.

From 2011 to 2015, Stowe starred as Victoria Grayson, the main antagonist of the ABC drama series Revenge. For this role, she was nominated for the 2012 Golden Globe Award for Best Actress – Television Series Drama.

Early life
Stowe, the first of three children, was born at the Queen of Angels Hospital, in Los Angeles, California, and raised in Eagle Rock, a section of Los Angeles. Her father, Robert Stowe, was a civil engineer from Oregon, while her mother, Mireya (née Mora Steinvorth), came from a prominent family in Costa Rica. One of Stowe's maternal great-great-grandfathers, politician José Joaquín Mora Porras, was a younger brother of President Juan Rafael Mora Porras, who governed Costa Rica from 1849 to 1859. Another maternal great-great-grandfather, Bruno Carranza, was briefly President of that country in 1870 (he resigned three months after taking office); his wife, Stowe's great-great-grandmother Gerónima Montealegre, was the sister of President José María Montealegre Fernández, who governed Costa Rica from 1859 to 1863, and himself the son of his country's first Vice Head of State Mariano Montealegre Bustamante. One of Stowe's maternal great-grandfathers was a German immigrant to Costa Rica.

Stowe's father suffered from multiple sclerosis, and she accompanied him to his medical treatments.

Stowe originally aspired to become a concert pianist, taking lessons between the ages of ten and eighteen. She later explained that playing the piano was a means to escape having to socialize with other children her age. Her Russian-born music teacher, Sergei Tarnowsky, had faith in Stowe, even teaching her from his deathbed. Following his death at the age of 92, she quit, later commenting, "I just felt it was time to not be by myself anymore."

Acting career

Early years
Not being especially interested in her college classes, she volunteered to do performances at the Solaris, a Beverly Hills theater, where a movie agent saw her in a play and got her several offers of appearances in TV and films. In 1978, she made her debut in an episode in the police drama series Baretta, followed by a string of TV work with guest appearances on The Amazing Spider-Man, Barnaby Jones and Little House on the Prairie. In 1978, she played a leading role as Mary in the television movie, The Nativity (1978). She starred in two NBC miniseries: Beulah Land (1980) and The Gangster Chronicles (1981), which starred Brian Benben, her future husband. She also starred in several television films, such as Amazons (1984) and Blood & Orchids (1986).

Breakthrough and film career

In 1987, Stowe appeared in her first breakthrough role in the feature film Stakeout with Richard Dreyfuss and Emilio Estevez. The film debuted at No.1 at the box office. In 1988, she played a leading role in Ciro Durán's film Tropical Snow, with David Carradine. She co-starred with Mark Harmon in the comedy Worth Winning, with Kevin Costner in the 1989 thriller Revenge, and opposite Jack Nicholson in 1990 in The Two Jakes. She played a leading role in the 1991 independent film Closet Land.

In 1992, she appeared opposite Kurt Russell in the crime drama Unlawful Entry. That same year, Stowe played Cora Munro in The Last of the Mohicans, which also starred Daniel Day-Lewis. Her critically acclaimed performance in the film, which grossed more than $75 million worldwide, elevated Stowe from supporting player to an A-list movie star. The next year, director Robert Altman cast Stowe in the award-winning ensemble cast movie Short Cuts, where she gave one of her most acclaimed screen performances as the wife of a compulsively lying and adulterous police officer played by Tim Robbins. She won the National Society of Film Critics Awards for Best Supporting Actress, a Golden Globe Award and a Volpi Cup for Best Ensemble Cast for her performance in the movie. She also made a cameo appearance in Stakeout sequel Another Stakeout. The following year, Stowe played a leading role as a blind musician in the thriller Blink, in the neo-noir thriller China Moon, and in the Western Bad Girls. The year after that, she was a sympathetic psychiatrist in the financially successful and critically lauded science-fiction movie 12 Monkeys. Stowe received a Saturn Awards nomination for this performance. 

In 1994 Stowe was named one of People magazine's "50 Most Beautiful People in the World". In 1995, Stowe was chosen by Empire as one of the "100 Sexiest Stars in Film History".

Stowe postponed her acting career in 1996 to concentrate on her family life. She settled for several years in a Texas ranch, with her daughter May and husband Brian Benben. In 1998, she came back with The Proposition and Playing by Heart, and then The General's Daughter, opposite John Travolta in 1999. In 2001, she starred in the science-fiction box office bomb Impostor. In 2002, she played Julia Moore in the war film We Were Soldiers with Mel Gibson, and the box office flop action-comedy Avenging Angelo opposite Sylvester Stallone. In 2003, she starred in the thriller Octane as Senga Wilson, a single mother trying to save her teenage daughter (Mischa Barton) from a bizarre cult obsessed with blood and cars.

Recent years
Stowe's onscreen appearances became increasingly rare in the 2000s, as she focused on motherhood. She later stated in an interview : "I never thought, 'I'm retiring,' but I didn't feel that 'thing' revving in me. I was much more focused on May. It was frustrating at times, but now I see how she's turned out, I wouldn't have it any other way." She occasionally appeared in some TV productions, such as Saving Milly, an adaptation of Morton Kondracke's book of the same name, of a woman diagnosed with Parkinson's disease. Stowe starred in the not-picked-up Fox pilot Southern Comfort about a woman who takes over her mobster husband's business when he gets sent to prison. In 2007, she appeared in the recurring role of Dr. Samantha Kohl in Jeff Goldblum's detective drama Raines on NBC, a mid-season replacement. The series was canceled after two months. In 2009 she starred in the Lifetime movie, The Christmas Hope.

In 2011, Stowe announced her return and began playing Victoria Grayson, the glamorous and powerful matriarch of the Grayson family, on ABC's television drama series Revenge. It debuted on September 21, and was picked up for a full season by ABC on October 13. Stowe's portrayal of the character received critical praise, and she was nominated for a Golden Globe Award for Best Actress – Television Series Drama for this role. In April 2012, she was listed at No. 5 in People magazine's annual Most Beautiful Woman list. The series ended in 2015 after four seasons and 89 episodes.

In May and June 2016, Stowe guest hosted primetime films on Turner Classic Movies, appearing in dozens of wraparounds on the channel. In 2019, she returned to acting starring as actress Margot Weston in the Netflix musical drama series, Soundtrack. The series was canceled after one season.

Personal life
In 1982, Stowe married Brian Benben, whom she met on the set of the NBC miniseries The Gangster Chronicles the previous year. Now living in Pacific Palisades, Los Angeles, they have lived on a ranch west of Austin, near Fredericksburg, Texas. The couple have a daughter born in 1996.

In 2008, Stowe traveled to Haiti and helped found Artists for Peace and Justice. She is on the board of directors of the foundation.

Filmography

Film

Television

Awards and nominations

References

External links

 
 
 
 
 Madeleine Stowe at People.com

20th-century American actresses
21st-century American actresses
Actresses from California
Actresses from Los Angeles
American film actresses
American people of Costa Rican descent
American people of German descent
American television actresses
Glendale High School (Glendale, California) alumni
Hispanic and Latino American actresses
Living people
People from Blanco County, Texas
University of Southern California alumni
Volpi Cup winners
1958 births